Llangan is a small village and community in the Vale of Glamorgan, Wales. It is located approximately  outside the market town of Cowbridge. As a community it contains the settlements of St Mary Hill, Treoes and Llangan itself. It is in the historic county of Glamorgan.

Llangan became an important religious site in the late 18th century due to the work and preaching of its church's vicar David Jones, an early supporter of Calvinistic Methodism in Wales.

Notes

External links
Llangan Community Council Website
Google maps

Villages in the Vale of Glamorgan
Communities in the Vale of Glamorgan